Haenamichnus is an ichnogenus that has been attributed to azhdarchid pterosaurs. In 2002, paleontologists Koo-Geun Hwang, Min Huh, Martin Lockley, David Unwin and Joanna Wright named the type species Haenamichnus uhangriensis, based on fossil tracks they found in the Uhangri Formation of South Korea, dating to 81 to 79 million years ago during the Campanian. A second species, H. gainensis, was discovered from the Haman Formation, but is now considered a bipedal crocodylomorph track reassigned to as Batrachopus cf. grandis.

See also
 Timeline of pterosaur research
 Ichnology
 Pterosaur ichnogenera

References

Fossil trackways